Robert Hudson Walker Jr. (April 15, 1940 – December 5, 2019) was an American actor who appeared in films including Easy Rider (1969) and was a familiar presence on television in the 1960s and early 1970s. He became less active in later decades.

Early life 
Walker was born in Jamaica, Queens, New York; his parents were actors Robert Walker and Jennifer Jones. He attended The Lawrenceville School and trained as an actor at the Actors Studio.

He studied Tai Chi Chuan under Marshall Ho'o, a skill that he later exhibited in his role in Easy Rider.

Career 
Walker began his acting career in 1962 with TV roles on Route 66 ("Across Walnuts and Wine") and Naked City ("Dust Devil on a Quiet Street", playing the title role of an emotionally disturbed actor who lived and performed on the streets and in circuses). His film debut was in The Hook in 1963; other film appearances, in addition to Easy Rider, included the title role in Ensign Pulver (1964) with Burl Ives and Walter Matthau; The War Wagon (1967) with John Wayne and Kirk Douglas; the title role in Young Billy Young (1969), alongside Robert Mitchum; and Beware! The Blob, or—Son of Blob (1972). He starred in Angkor: Cambodia Express (1982) with Nancy Kwan, Christopher George, Woody Strode, and Sorapong Chatree.

On television in the 1960s, in The Big Valley episode "My Son, My Son" (1965), Walker portrayed Evan Miles, an emotionally disturbed college dropout who becomes obsessed with childhood friend Audra Barkley. In 1966, at the age of 26, he was cast in the Star Trek episode "Charlie X" (1966) as Charles 'Charlie' Evans, a 17-year-old social misfit with psychic powers. Also in 1966, he appeared in the fifth season of the series Combat! in the episode "Ollie Joe" . He had the title role in an episode of The Time Tunnel titled "Billy the Kid" (1967). He also portrayed Nick Baxter, an ill alien who caused the deaths of humans by touch, in an episode of The Invaders ("Panic", 1967). He played Mark Cole in an episode of Bonanza ("The Gentle Ones", 1967).

In the 1970s, Walker had a role in an episode of Columbo ("Mind Over Mayhem", 1974), and as an innocent longshoreman who takes the blame for a murder on Quincy, M.E. ("The Hero Syndrome", 1977). He also appeared in the pilot episode of The Eddie Capra Mysteries (1978).

Walker maintained an episodic presence on television in the 1980s and 1990s. He guest-starred in two episodes of Murder, She Wrote with Angela Lansbury, the first time in "The Corpse Flew First Class" (1987), and as a mentally handicapped man in "Shear Madness" (1990). He appeared in L.A. Law and In the Heat of the Night, both in 1991. He also made a television series appearance in 1993 and had a small role in the film Beyond the Darkness (2018) before officially retiring in 2018.

Personal life and death
Walker was married three times, to Ellie Wood, to Judy Motulsky, and finally to Dawn Walker. He had 7 children.

He died at the age of 79 at his home in Malibu, California, on December 5, 2019.

Filmography

References

External links 

"Actor Robert Walker Jr. and friend, Malibu, 1965", photograph by Dennis Hopper from 2011 book of Hopper's photographs, via The Independent.

1940 births
2019 deaths
American male film actors
American male television actors
People from Queens, New York
Male actors from New York City
20th-century American male actors
Lawrenceville School alumni
New Star of the Year (Actor) Golden Globe winners